Kareemullah Shah (died 15 April 1913) was a Muslim Sufi, saint and scholar of the Naqshbandi order from Indian sub continent. He was born in 1838 in the city of Hyderabad. His spiritual successor was Ghousi Shah.

Death

He died on 15 April 1913. His grave is situated in his mosque "Masjid-E-Kareemullah Shah", Begum Bazar, behind Osmania general Hospital, Afzalgunj, Hyderabad.

Urs

His annual Urs is organized by his present successor Moulana Ghousavi Shah (Secretary General: The Conference of World Religions & President: All India Muslim Conference) every year.

See also

 Alhaj Moulana Ghousavi Shah
 Ghousi Shah
 Machiliwale Shah
 Mahmoodullah Shah
 Moulana Sahvi Shah

References 

1838 births
1913 deaths
Sufi mystics
Indian male poets
19th-century Indian poets
Indian Sufis
Sufi poets
Scholars of Sufism
20th-century Indian poets
Writers from Hyderabad, India
19th-century Indian male writers
20th-century Indian male writers